There are several lakes named Mud Lake within the U.S. state of Georgia.

 Mud Lake, Camden County, Georgia.    
 Mud Lake, Charlton County, Georgia.  
 Mud Lake, Lowndes County, Georgia.   
 Mud Lake, Ware County, Georgia.

References
 USGS-U.S. Board on Geographic Names

Lakes of Georgia (U.S. state)